Marko Ćetković (Cyrillic; Марко Ћeткoвић; born 10 July 1986) is a Montenegrin professional footballer who plays as a midfielder for Montenegrin club FK Mornar. He also played for the Montenegrin national team.

Club career

Youth
Ćetković began his career with Crvena Stijena and Mladost Podgorica. When he left Mladost, he played in the Montenegrin Second League, at the time one of two third-tier leagues in Serbia and Montenegro's football pyramid.

Zeta
Ćetković made his top-flight debut with Zeta in the 2006-07 season, the first season after Montenegro split from Serbia. After Zeta won the league, he left a strong impression in the qualifying rounds of the Champions League that season. He scored a goal against FBK Kaunas, after which he played both legs against Rangers. Although Zeta was eliminated, the Rangers' website published a post-match report recognizing Ćetković as "by far and away the stand out player" of his team.

Partizan
On 31 August 2007, Ćetković signed a four-year contract with Serbian team Partizan. On 5 December 2007, he played in the final of the Trofeo Santiago Bernabéu in a 2–0 loss against Real Madrid, coming on as a substitute for Zoran Tošić in the 58th minute. 

Initially, Ćetković saw more playing time under coach Miroslav Đukić, but fell out of favor with the subsequent coach, Slaviša Jokanović. After leaving Partizan in July 2008, he told a journalist that the move to Partizan was a mistake in his career.

Mogren
In August 2008, Ćetković signed for Mogren. At the time of Ćetković's transfer, Mogren was coached by Dejan Vukićević and had a respected generation of players from the Montenegrin national team involving the likes of Radoslav Batak, Ivan Janjušević, Petar Grbić, Janko Simović, and Draško Božović. Ćetković played regularly for Mogren when they won the Montenegrin First League in 2009, and also scored the winning goal against Budućnost, the previous season's champion.

Jagiellonia
In July 2011, he joined Polish team Jagiellonia Białystok on a three-year contract. He spent two half-seasons out on loan; first in Thailand with Buriram United F.C. and then with Podbeskidzie Bielsko-Biała. Overall, Ćetković played a total of 19 league games for Jagiellonia.

Budućnost
After spending two seasons in Poland, Ćetković returned to his homeland and signed for Budućnost in July 2013. He started his 2013–14 season by scoring 6 goals in 27 games for Budućnost. At the end of the 2014 season, Ćetković was recognized as one of the three best midfielders of Montenegrin First League that season by the Trade Union of Professional Football Players of Montenegro.

Laçi
On 16 August 2014, Ćetković officially signed with Albanian Superliga side Laçi on a one-year deal, taking the vacant number 20 for the upcoming 2014–15 season. It was also reported that the team's goalkeeper Miroslav Vujadinović had his part on Ćetković's transfer, convincing the player to join the team.

He made his official debut with the club on 24 August in team's opening league match of the season against Partizani Tirana at home, coming on as a second-half substitute. Ćetković scored his first goal of the season in the matchday 5 against Tirana, netting the opening goal of the 2–0 home win, and was selected Man of the Match. Two week later, Ćetković was again in the scoresheet where he converted a penalty-kick to help Laçi conquer Vllaznia Shkodër 3–0 at home.

On 21 July 2015, during the preparations for the new season, Ćetković underwent surgery in his right ankle in a hospital in Zagreb that kept him out until November 2015. The constant pain in his leg had concerned him for months, and the surgery was unavoidable. Due to the surgery, Ćetković missed the European campaign and the start of the season.

After an impressive first season in Albanian football he was subject to interest and formal offers from Skënderbeu Korçë, Kukësi, Partizani Tirana and Tirana, but he extended his contract with KF Laçi for another year.

In April 2016, Ćetković scored his team's both goals in the 2015–16 Albanian Cup semi-final tie against Skënderbeu Korçë, as Laçi progressed to the final thanks to the away goal rule. However, in the final, Laçi was defeated 5–3 on penalties after the regular and extra time finished in a 1–1; Ćetković himself scored his team's second penalty shootout attempt. He left the team in June.

Sarajevo
On 14 June 2016, Ćetković signed with Sarajevo from Bosnia and Herzegovina. On 6 August 2016 he scored a goal in a 1–1 tie against Čelik Zenica. On 10 January 2017, it was announced that he terminated his contract with Sarajevo.

Partizani Tirana
On 12 January 2017, Ćetković returned in Albanian Superliga by signing a six-month contract with Partizani Tirana, taking squad number 21 for the second part of 2016–17 season.

He made his first appearance for the club came on 28 January in the matchday 19, starting in a 2–0 defeat at Luftëtari Gjirokastër. His first and only goal of the season would come on penultimate week of the season where Partizani defeated Korabi Peshkopi 3–0. He played 16 league matches until the end of the season as Partizani were runner-up in the Albanian Superliga, losing the championship to Kukësi for only three points.

On 12 June 2017, Ćetković left Partizani after deciding not to extend his contract, returning in Montenegro after 10 years.

Return to Mladost Podgorica
Only one day later, Ćetković returned to his birth country to sign with Mladost Podgorica, returning to the club after 12 years.

Sutjeska Nikšić
On 13 June 2018 Ćetković signed a one-year contract with Sutjeska Nikšić. At the end of the 2018-19 season, he was nominated as one of the three best midfielders in the league by the Trade Union of Professional Football Players of Montenegro.

Mornar Bar
On 12 June 2021 Cetkovic signed a contract with Mornar, new club in Montenegro first football league.

International career

Youth
Ćetković's first international appearance was for Serbia and Montenegro U17; he debuted on 24 March 2003 against Finland for the second qualifying round of the 2004 UEFA European Under-17 Championship, which finished in a 1–1 draw. Following that, Ćetković made another two appearances, scoring once in the process. Ćetković continued to play for Montenegro U21, making nine appearances from when Montenegro declared independence from Serbia.

Senior
On 17 November 2010, Ćetković made his debut with the senior side during the friendly match against Azerbaijan, appearing in the last 15 minutes of the 2–0 home win.

He made his competitive debut for Montenegro on 11 October 2011 in the UEFA Euro 2012 qualifying match against Switzerland, playing full-90 minutes in a 2–0 away loss.

Ćetković was called up again in the senior side by its new coach Branko Brnović for the UEFA Euro 2012 qualifying play-off tie against Czech Republic. In the first leg at Generali Arena on 11 November 2011, Ćetković was even in the bench with the match finishing in a 2–0 loss for Ćetković's side. In the returning leg four days later, he was on the bench but still unable to make his debut with Montenegro who was defeated 1–0 at home and was kicked out with the aggregate 3–0.

On 17 November 2013, he scored his first goal for the Montenegrin national team in a friendly against Luxembourg.

Personal life
His brother Đorđije is also a Montenegro international who has been capped 7 times by the national team, and his uncle is former Yugoslavia international footballer Predrag Mijatović. He once stated that he loved basketball and that he would have loved to play basketball if he were taller.

Career statistics

Club

International

International goals
As of match played 14 June 2016. Montenegro score listed first, score column indicates score after each Ćetković goal.

Honours

Club
Zeta
 Montenegrin First League: 2006–07

Partizan Belgrade
Serbian Superliga: 2007–08
Serbian Cup: 2007–08

Mogren Budva
Montenegrin First League: 2008–09, 2010–11

Laçi
Albanian Cup: 2014–15
Albanian Supercup: 2015

Mladost Podgorica
Montenegrin Cup: 2017–18

Sutjeska
Montenegrin First League: 2018–19

References

External links
 
 
 
 Profile at sportmarketing.pl site 
 
 Profile at Srbijafudbal 

1986 births
Living people
Footballers from Podgorica
Association football midfielders
Serbia and Montenegro footballers
Montenegrin footballers
Montenegro under-21 international footballers
Montenegro international footballers
OFK Titograd players
FK Zeta players
FK Partizan players
FK Mogren players
Jagiellonia Białystok players
Marko Cetkovic
Podbeskidzie Bielsko-Biała players
FK Budućnost Podgorica players
KF Laçi players
FK Sarajevo players
FK Partizani Tirana players
FK Sutjeska Nikšić players
Second League of Serbia and Montenegro players
First League of Serbia and Montenegro players
Montenegrin First League players
Serbian SuperLiga players
Ekstraklasa players
Marko Cetkovic
Kategoria Superiore players
Premier League of Bosnia and Herzegovina players
Montenegrin expatriate footballers
Expatriate footballers in Serbia
Montenegrin expatriate sportspeople in Serbia
Expatriate footballers in Poland
Montenegrin expatriate sportspeople in Poland
Expatriate footballers in Thailand
Montenegrin expatriate sportspeople in Thailand
Expatriate footballers in Albania
Montenegrin expatriate sportspeople in Albania
Expatriate footballers in Bosnia and Herzegovina
Montenegrin expatriate sportspeople in Bosnia and Herzegovina